Shaye Quinn Anderson  (born March 21, 1975) is a Canadian politician who was elected in the 2015 Alberta general election to the Legislative Assembly of Alberta representing the electoral district of Leduc-Beaumont. Anderson defeated longtime MLA George Rogers in an election that saw the NDPs win a majority government, the first government change the province had seen since 1971. On January 19, 2017, Anderson was sworn in as Minister of Municipal Affairs.

Anderson was defeated in the 2019 Alberta general election by United Conservative Party candidate Brad Rutherford. Following his defeat, Anderson moved back to his hometown of Duncan, British Columbia; in 2021, he sought the federal NDP nomination for Nanaimo—Ladysmith though was defeated.

Anderson attended Cowichan Secondary School, graduating in 1993. He is an install and repair technician for Telus and a shop union steward. He is from Duncan, British Columbia and has a diploma in physical education from Malaspina University-College in Nanaimo, British Columbia

His pronounced facial hair drew some attention after his election, with one columnist for the National Post calling it "the most conspicuous and healthy beard seen in Canadian politics this side of the 19th century."

Electoral history

2019 general election

2015 general election

References

Alberta New Democratic Party MLAs
Living people
Members of the Executive Council of Alberta
People from Duncan, British Columbia
21st-century Canadian politicians
Vancouver Island University alumni
1975 births